The Devil is a 1908 American silent short drama film directed by D. W. Griffith. A print of the film exists in the film archive of the Library of Congress.

Cast
 Harry Solter as Harold Thornton
 Claire McDowell as Mrs. Thornton
 George Gebhardt as The Devil
 D. W. Griffith
 Arthur V. Johnson as The Wife's Companion
 Florence Lawrence as A Model
 Jeanie MacPherson
 Mack Sennett as The Waiter

References

External links
 

1908 films
1908 drama films
Silent American drama films
American silent short films
American black-and-white films
The Devil in film
Films directed by D. W. Griffith
1908 short films
1900s American films
Silent horror films